Events in the year 1930 in Spain.

Incumbents
Monarch: Alfonso XIII
President of the Council of Ministers: Miguel Primo de Rivera (until 30 January), Dámaso Berenguer (starting 30 January)

Births
28 January – Luis de Pablo, composer (died 2021) 
4 June – Vicente Alejandro Guillamón, journalist and writer (died 2021) 
19 June – Victoriano Ríos Pérez, physician and politician (died 2018) 
16 November – Andrés Reguera, politician (died 2000)

Full date unknown
Luis Miravitlles, scientist and writer (died 1995)

Deaths
October 20 – Valeriano Weyler, 1st Duke of Rubí. (b. 1838)

References

 
Years of the 20th century in Spain
Spain
Spain